Forced into Glory: Abraham Lincoln's White Dream (2000) is a book written by Lerone Bennett Jr., an African-American scholar and historian, who served as the  executive editor of Ebony for decades. It criticizes United States President Abraham Lincoln and claims that his reputation as the "Great Emancipator" during the American Civil War is undeserved.

In his introduction, Bennett wrote:

The book is dedicated to those individuals whom Bennett calls "the real abolitionists", including Frederick Douglass, Thaddeus Stevens, and Wendell Phillips. In the dedication, he praises them for forcing Lincoln "into glory".

Bennett's critics, including historians James M. McPherson and Eric Foner, as well as political scientist Lucas E. Morel, believe that he ignores Lincoln's political and moral growth during the course of the Civil War. In addition, they surmise that Bennett oversimplifies the complexities of the period on issues of race when criticizing Lincoln. They also point out many direct errors and manipulations in the work, such as switching Lincoln's yes and no votes as senator, quoting out of context and presenting false numbers. Unlike Bennett, they conclude that Lincoln was instrumental in creating the framework that emancipated the slaves in the United States.

In a 2009 review of three newly published books on Lincoln, historian Brian Dirck referred to Bennett's 2000 work and linked him with Thomas DiLorenzo, another critic of Lincoln. He wrote that "Few Civil War scholars take Bennett and DiLorenzo seriously, pointing to their narrow political agenda and faulty research."

See also
The Real Lincoln

References

Further reading
 Barr, John M.  "Holding Up a Flawed Mirror to the American Soul: Abraham Lincoln in the Writings of Lerone Bennett Jr." Journal of the Abraham Lincoln Association 35.1 (2014): 43-65.  online
 Morel, Lucas E. "Forced Into Gory Lincoln Revisionism," Claremont Review of Books,'' (2000)  vol 1#1 online

External links

Booknotes interview with Bennett on Forced Into Glory, September 10, 2000, C-SPAN
Panel discussion on Forced Into Glory, September 24, 2000, C-SPAN

2000 non-fiction books
American history books
Books about Abraham Lincoln
Non-fiction books about American slavery
American Civil War books
20th-century history books